This is a discography of Bollywood composer duo Kalyanji Anandji, consisting of Kalyanji Virji Shah and Anandji Virji Shah. They have composed music for over 200 films in their 46-year career.

Discography

See also

 Kalyanji Anandji

External links

Discographies of Indian artists